Amr Talaat is the Egyptian Minister of Communications and Information Technology. He is a computer scientist and former business executive. Talaat was appointed on 14 June 2018.

References

External links 
 http://www.mcit.gov.eg/Minister_Biography

Communications Ministers of Egypt
Living people
Year of birth missing (living people)
21st-century Egyptian politicians